Thy Neighbour's Wife, also known as Poison and Midnight Vendetta, is a 2001 erotic thriller film directed by Jim Wynorski and starring Kari Wuhrer, Jeff Trachta, and Barbara Crampton.

External links

Review of film at Letterbox DVD

2001 films
Films directed by Jim Wynorski
2000s erotic thriller films
American erotic thriller films
2000s English-language films
2000s American films